Jack Wetter DCM (29 December 1887 – 29 July 1967) was a Welsh international rugby union player who played club rugby predominantly for Newport. He was captain for both his club and country and earned 10 caps for Wales.
 
Wetter's rugby career was disrupted by the outbreak of World War I, in which he served. He was awarded the Distinguished Conduct Medal during the conflict.

Rugby career
After playing club rugby for several lower-level teams Wetter was successful at a trial for Newport, and in 1912 he represented the team against Plymouth. Wetter stayed with the club until 1925, and in the 1922/23 season, in which Newport were unbeaten, he captained the team. He also played for two Newport teams against international opposition; the 1912 touring South Africans and the 1924 touring All Blacks.

Wetter made his debut for Wales against Scotland on 7 February 1914, in which he scored his first international try and Wales ran out winners 24–5. It was a rough game, in which, Scotland captain David Bain quoted, "The dirtier side won". Wetter would earn 10 caps in total for Wales, stretched either side of the War, and in the last three was awarded the captaincy. He scored a total of four international tries and a single conversion.

When Wetter took to the pitch for his final game for Wales in 1924, he was 36 years and one month old, the oldest Welsh player to take the position at centre. This record would stand for 77 years, until beaten by Neath's Allan Bateman.

International games played
Wales
  1920, 1921
  1914, 1920, 1924
  1914, 1920
  1924
  1914, 1920

External links
 International caps and honours photo of some of Wetter's international caps

Bibliography

References

1887 births
1967 deaths
Blaina RFC players
British Army personnel of World War I
Monmouthshire County RFC players
Newport RFC players
Rugby union players from Newport, Wales
Pill Harriers RFC players
Recipients of the Distinguished Conduct Medal
Wales international rugby union players
Wales rugby union captains
Welsh rugby union players
Rugby union fly-halves